His Call is a 1925 Soviet drama film directed by Yakov Protazanov. It was also released as 23 January in the Soviet Union and as Broken Chains in the United States.

Plot
The main protagonists of the film are Katya, the daughter of a factory worker and Andrey, the son of the former owner of the factory who illegally returns to the USSR to find treasures hidden by his father. The film title refers to the Communist party's appeal, after Lenin's death, to enlarge its membership.

Cast
 Varvara Popova as Katya Sushkova
 Maria Blumenthal-Tamarina as Katya's grandmother
 Ivan Koval-Samborsky as Andrey
 Olga Zhizneva as Lulu
 Anatoly Ktorov as Vladimir Zaglobin
 Vera Maretskaya as Varya
 Mikhail Zharov as Worker
 Tatyana Mukhina as Girl

References

Bibliography
.
.

External links

1925 films
Gorky Film Studio films
Soviet black-and-white films
Soviet silent feature films
Films directed by Yakov Protazanov
Soviet drama films
1925 drama films
Silent drama films